Makeyevka is the name of several rural localities in Russia:
Makeyevka, Kursk Oblast, a village in Rusanovsky Selsoviet of Fatezhsky District in Kursk Oblast
Makeyevka, Republic of Mordovia, a settlement in Michurinsky Selsoviet of Chamzinsky District in the Republic of Mordovia; 
Makeyevka, Tula Oblast, a village in Golovenkovskaya Rural Administration of Shchyokinsky District in Tula Oblast
Makeyevka, Zabaykalsky Krai, a selo in Nerchinsky District of Zabaykalsky Krai